"Wherever I Lay My Hat (That's My Home)" is a song written by Marvin Gaye, Barrett Strong and Norman Whitfield, and first recorded by Gaye in 1962. It was the B-side to his 1969 hit "Too Busy Thinking 'Bout My Baby". Paul Young's version of the song was a UK No. 1 single for three weeks in July 1983.

Paul Young version

The Paul Young version, from the album No Parlez, is stylistically notable for its use of fretless bass, played by Pino Palladino.  Though a major UK hit that broke Young as a star, the song fared less well on the Billboard Hot 100, where it peaked at No. 70, but was later used in the 1986 film Ruthless People and its accompanying soundtrack album.

Production
According to Young, when he was making the album No Parlez, the label sent him a number of songs that he thought were too complex.  He said: "I just want a simple three-chord trick with a melody."  He remembered a B-side track by Marvin Gaye he heard when he was 14, found a recording, and decided to record the song.  He slowed the song down, and added more melancholy to the vocal.

Palladino was then recruited from the Jools Holland's band, Jools Holland and His Millionaires.  The song was produced by Laurie Latham, who asked for an intro for the song, and Palladino quoted the bassoon melody at the opening of Stravinsky's The Rite of Spring for the opening bass line. Palladino however thought that the bass line in the recording was too loud and out of tune. The keyboard player Ian Kewley added a keyboard motif to the song, and it was then decided that the song should be released as a single.

Reception
In a retrospective review, AllMusic journalist Dave Thompson wrote that Young's version of the song "left mouths hanging open in awe" and described it as "a beautifully impassioned take on what was, in all fairness, never one of Marvin Gaye's greatest performances."

Charts

Weekly charts

Year-end charts

Certifications

References

1962 songs
1983 singles
Marvin Gaye songs
Paul Young songs
Taylor Hicks songs
Songs written by Barrett Strong
Songs written by Marvin Gaye
Songs written by Norman Whitfield
Irish Singles Chart number-one singles
UK Singles Chart number-one singles
Pop ballads
CBS Records singles